The Good Building Design and Construction in the Philippines is a handbook developed in cooperation with the German Technical Cooperation (GTZ), UNDP Regional Center in Bangkok, and the Secretariat of the United Nations International Strategy for Disaster Reduction.

The handbook aims to provide a comprehensive information to house owners, designers, builders, and building monitors to teach principles of good design and construction in natural hazard prone areas such as the Philippines.

Main authors
Robin Willison, is a Civil Engineer and a consultant for Disaster risk reduction has written the handbook and provided photographs through experience in tragedy recovery during impacts of hazards in the Philippines and Indonesia.

Olaf Neusser, is a disaster risk consultant for GTZ and has provided support for the assessment of building culture in Leyte and Samar through the effects of local catastrophe in the area.

Analogy of good building structure

As the Philippines lies within the Pacific Ring of Fire where earthquakes and eruptions are more likely to occur as well as being at the edge of the Pacific Ocean where violent storms are likely to develop, proper construction philosophies and strategic location must be assessed so it can resist external forces.

Foundation
The book has given a detailed identification of proper house foundation and ground classification to ensure it is not liquefaction prone.

Structure
Principle of coherent structure and the importance of the presence of structural columns to support the walls and roof structure in the event of environmental hazards such as ravaging flood, strong winds and earthquakes.

Roof truss tying
Roof trusses must be welded to purlins and tied using extruding column steel reinforcements. to ensure it is fixed properly to the columns and will not fly-off during strong winds.

Proper location
Proper location has been discussed in the handbook to ensure that the ground below is sturdy to support the weight of the structure. It must be composed of bedrock and must not be landfilled and is away from slopes and river beds.

Construction materials
Broken rough rocks and fine sand must be used and must be free from external sediments as it may affect the strength of the concrete mix.

References

External links
United Nations International Strategy for Disaster Risk Reduction
National Disaster Risk Reduction and Management Council of the Philippines
Housing and Land Use Regulatory Board of the Philippines

2008 non-fiction books
Design books
Philippine books
Handbooks and manuals
Construction standards
Urban planning in the Philippines
United Nations Development Programme
Standards of the Philippines